João Manuel Neves Virgínia (born 10 October 1999) is a Portuguese professional footballer who plays as a goalkeeper for Eredivisie club Cambuur, on loan from Premier League club Everton.

Club career
Born in Faro on the Algarve, Virgínia began his youth career at S.L. Benfica. In August 2015, he agreed a transfer to Arsenal amidst interest from Manchester United, effective from his 16th birthday in October. In August 2018, he signed a three-year deal at Everton.

On 11 July 2019, Virgínia joined Reading on a season-long loan deal. Everton recalled him early due to a lack of playing time, on 5 January 2020.

Virgínia played his first professional game for Everton on 16 September 2020, in a 3–0 home win in the EFL Cup match against League Two side Salford City. Days later, he extended his contract to June 2024. On 13 March 2021, he made his Premier League debut as a substitute for the injured Jordan Pickford in a 1–2 home defeat to Burnley. Eight days later, he made his FA Cup debut, starting in a 0–2 quarter-final defeat to Manchester City at Goodison Park.

On 25 August 2021, Virgínia returned to Lisbon, joining Sporting CP on a season-long loan. Kept aside in the Primeira Liga by Antonio Adán, he made his debut on 15 October in the third round of the Taça de Portugal in a 4–0 win at C.F. Os Belenenses. He made his European debut on 7 December in the final game of the UEFA Champions League group stage, a 4–2 loss at AFC Ajax that saw both teams through to the last 16. His sole league appearance was on the final day, playing the first 79 minutes of a 4–0 final day win over C.D. Santa Clara at the Estádio José Alvalade before being replaced by André Paulo; Sporting declined the option to make his transfer permanent for €5 million.

On 8 July 2022, Virgínia joined SC Cambuur of the Dutch Eredivisie on a season-long loan. He made his debut on 6 August as the season began with a 2–0 loss at home to newly promoted Excelsior Rotterdam. He was sent off on 11 January 2023 in the second round of the KNVB Cup, a 1–0 loss at amateur Tweede Divisie team De Treffers; defender Doke Schmidt ended the game in goal as no substitutions remained. The card was rescinded, the third time in four occasions that one given by referee Joey Kooij was overturned.

International career
Across all age groups, Virgínia earned 29 caps for Portugal at youth level, starting with a 1–0 win for the under-16s over the Netherlands in Vila Real de Santo António on 14 February 2015. On 12 November 2016, having just turned 17, he made his under-20 debut in a 1–1 friendly draw with Morocco in Rabat.

Virgínia represented the under-19 team that won the 2018 UEFA European Championship in Finland, defeating Italy 4–3 in the final. He also played in a group-stage elimination for the under-20 team in Poland at the 2019 FIFA World Cup.

Honours
Everton U23s

 Premier League Cup: 2018–19

Sporting CP
Taça da Liga: 2021–22

Career statistics

References

External links

1999 births
Living people
People from Faro, Portugal
Portuguese footballers
Portugal youth international footballers
Portugal under-21 international footballers
Association football goalkeepers
S.L. Benfica footballers
Arsenal F.C. players
Everton F.C. players
Reading F.C. players
Sporting CP footballers
SC Cambuur players
English Football League players
Premier League players
Portuguese expatriate footballers
Expatriate footballers in England
Portuguese expatriate sportspeople in England
Expatriate footballers in the Netherlands
Portuguese expatriate sportspeople in the Netherlands
Sportspeople from Faro District